Bang Si Thong is one of the nine subdistricts (tambon) of Bang Kruai District, in Nonthaburi Province, Thailand. The subdistrict is bounded by (clockwise from north) Bang Krang, Bang Si Mueang, Bang Phai, Bang Kruai, Wat Chalo and Bang Khanun subdistricts. In 2020 it had a total population of 11,426 people.

Administration

Central administration
The subdistrict is subdivided into 5 administrative villages (muban).

Local administration
The whole area of the subdistrict is covered by Bang Si Thong Subdistrict Municipality.

References

External links
Website of Bang Si Thong Subdistrict Municipality

Tambon of Nonthaburi province
Populated places in Nonthaburi province